Aaron Kyle Tveit (born October 21, 1983) is an American actor and singer.

Tveit originated the lead role of Christian the composer in the stage adaptation of Moulin Rouge! on Broadway, a performance for which he won the 2020 Tony Award for Best Actor in a Musical and received a 2020 Grammy Award nomination. His other work on the Broadway stage includes originating the roles of Gabe in Next to Normal and Frank Abagnale Jr. in Catch Me If You Can, as well as performing the roles of Fiyero in Wicked and Link Larkin in Hairspray.

Tveit has also portrayed several musical theatre roles on screen, such as Enjolras in the film adaptation of Les Misérables (2012), as well as Danny Zuko in Fox's Grease: Live (2016). Tveit is also known for his work in television, including the roles of Gareth Ritter on BrainDead, Tripp van der Bilt on Gossip Girl, Mike Warren on Graceland, and Danny Bailey in Schmigadoon!.

Early life and education 
Tveit was born in Middletown, Orange County, New York, to Posie and Stanley Tveit. His brother, Jon, is five years younger and a Catholic priest in the Archdiocese of New York. His surname is Norwegian.

Tveit graduated from Middletown High School in 2001, where he was active both in chorus and sports, playing golf, soccer and basketball; he also starred in all four of his school's musical theater productions: Seymour in Little Shop of Horrors in 9th grade, Joe Hardy in Damn Yankees in 10th grade, Tony in West Side Story in 11th grade, and Huck in Big River in 12th grade. As a child, he played the violin and French horn. He turned down business school scholarships to major in vocal performance at Ithaca College, a decision his parents supported, before switching to musical theater after his first year because he missed acting and theater.

Career

2003–2007: Early career and Broadway debut 
Tveit began his professional career in 2003 when he joined the national tour of Rent as Steve and the understudy for Roger/Mark. He was in his second year of studying at Ithaca College at the time; nine years later, in 2012, Tveit completed his college degree, when he was given college credit for his theatre roles.

Following Rent, he returned to school briefly but left to play Link Larkin in the first national tour of Hairspray. He made his Broadway debut in this role in 2006. In the following two years, he performed in regional productions including as Matt in Barrington Stage Company's Calvin Berger in July 2007 and as D'Artagnan in a musical adaptation of The Three Musketeers which played at the North Shore Music Theatre from August to September 2007, before returning to the Broadway production of Hairspray. Other credits include an early workshop of The Black Suits. Tveit made his film debut in Ghost Town (2008), as a young anesthesiologist.

2008–2011: Next to Normal, Catch Me If You Can, and Gossip Girl

Next to Normal and Wicked 
In 2007, Tveit originated the role of Gabe in the Off-Broadway production of the musical Next to Normal. The production ran from January 16 through March 16, 2008, at the Second Stage Theater. Tveit received a nomination for the Lucille Lortel Award for Outstanding Featured Actor for this role.

In the interim time before the out-of-town production of Next to Normal, Tveit played Dean in the musical theatre adaptation of the film Saved!, which ran for a limited engagement at Playwrights Horizons in June 2008. Also in June 2008, Tveit took over the role of Fiyero in Wicked on Broadway. He left the show in November to reprise his role in the Arena Stage production of Next to Normal, for which he won the 2009 Helen Hayes Award for Outstanding Supporting Performer in a Non-Resident Production.

Tveit returned to Wicked as Fiyero in January 2009. However, he left once again on March 8, 2009, after only a couple of months, to join the Broadway production of Next to Normal, which began previews in March 2009 and officially opened on April 15. His performance as Gabe earned him the Clarence Derwent Award from the Actors' Equity Association. Tveit was included on AfterElton.com's 2009 list of the "37 Hottest Guys in Theater".

Catch Me If You Can 
Tveit left Next to Normal on June 6, 2009, to prepare for Catch Me If You Can, where he played Frank Abagnale Jr. The musical was performed at the 5th Avenue Theatre in Seattle from July 28 through August 16, 2009. Tveit returned to Next to Normal from September 7 through January 3, 2010. In August, he also starred in the Hollywood Bowl's production of Rent directed by Neil Patrick Harris, as Roger Davis. He took part in the MCC Theater Miscast Gala in 2009 and 2010.

Tveit played Frank Abagnale Jr in the Broadway production of Catch Me If You Can, opening on April 10, 2011, and closing on September 4, 2011. For this role he was nominated for the Outer Critics Circle Award for Outstanding Actor in a Musical, the Drama League Award for Distinguished Performance, and the Fred Astaire Award for Best Male Dancer on Broadway.

Gossip Girl and other screen acting work 
During the Broadway production of Next to Normal, Tveit also had a recurring role in the CW series Gossip Girl as Tripp van der Bilt, the cousin of Nate Archibald. During this period, Tveit appeared in an episode of the television series Ugly Betty titled "All the World's a Stage" as Zachary Boule, Betty Suarez's boyfriend. He appeared in Rob Epstein's Howl, a biopic about the Allen Ginsberg poem and the controversy and trial that ensued after its publication. Tveit played Peter Orlovsky, Ginsberg's longtime partner, opposite James Franco. He was also a guest star on Law & Order: Special Victims Unit on April 21, 2010, as Jan, an animal-loving yoga instructor who is questioned about the death of his girlfriend, and then again on September 28, 2011, as Stevie Harris, a man with substance abuse issues who accuses his well-respected former basketball coach of sexual abuse.

2012–2017: Focus on screen acting and Les Misérables

Les Misérables and Graceland 
In 2012, Tveit played Enjolras, leader of the student revolutionary group in the film adaptation of Les Misérables. As the 'designated Broadway actor' in a celebrity ensemble cast, this was one of Tveit's most high-profile roles up to that point. On February 24, 2013, he performed with the cast of Les Misérables at the 85th Academy Awards ceremony. In July 2012, Tveit took part in a private reading for a new musical based on the animated film, Anastasia. He read for the character Dimitri, a con man who brings Anastasia to a wealthy Empress searching for her missing granddaughter, in return for a reward.

The following year, Tveit parlayed his stardom into a starring role in the USA Network series Graceland where he played undercover FBI Special Agent Mike Warren. The show premiered on June 6, 2013, and ran for thirty-eight episodes before being canceled after the completion of its third season in October 2015.

Between filming seasons of Graceland, Tveit starred in the Menier Chocolate Factory's production of Sondheim's Assassins as John Wilkes Booth. The production ran from November 21, 2014, to March 7, 2015. However, he had to leave the production on February 8, due to his working schedule. During this time he also began performing solo concerts and recorded his own album The Radio in My Head as well as the concept album for a new Broadway show An American Victory: A New Musical in January 2014 with Ashley Brown, Hugh Panaro, Ruthie Henshall, Alexander Gemignani, and many other Broadway stars. The cast recording was released more than two years later in April 2016. Additionally, he appeared in the film Big Sky which was released on August 14, 2015 and performed at the first Elsie Fest in New York that September.

Grease and BrainDead 
Following the end of Graceland, Tveit was cast in a variety of other television and film productions. In 2016, Tveit appeared as Danny Zuko in a live version of Grease that aired on Fox on January 31. He is featured on the soundtrack for Grease Live. He returned to the MCC Theater Miscast Gala in April 2016. Tveit then starred in the baseball themed movie Undrafted which was released on July 15. His next film Better Off Single was released in theaters and on demand on October 7.

In October 2015, it was announced that Tveit would star in CBS's summer series BrainDead, which premiered on June 13, 2016. Following the cancellation of BrainDead after one season on October 17, 2016, Tveit had time to perform more concerts in 2017 and more screen roles including a reprisal of his role from The Good Wife on an episode of The Good Fight and a starring role in the independent film Created Equal which held screenings in early 2018.

Tveit returned to Barrington Stage Company for their production of Company in the role of Bobby, running from August 10 to September 10, 2017. He next had a role in the Patricia Clarkson-starring crime thriller Out of Blue, which premiered at the 2018 Toronto International Film Festival.

2018–present: Moulin Rouge! and Schmigadoon!
In November 2017, Tveit participated in a developmental lab for the stage adaptation of the 2001 movie Moulin Rouge!, cast in the role as Christian, the character originally created by Ewan McGregor. In April 2018, it was announced that Tveit would be reprising his role in the premiere engagement of Moulin Rouge! at Boston's Emerson Colonial Theatre. The musical's premiere was scheduled for June 27; however, delays pushed the start of performances to July 10, 2018. Between the Boston and Broadway productions of Moulin Rouge!, Tveit had a recurring role as the aspiring politician Matt Dobbins on the 2019 CBS show The Code.

Tveit starred as Christian The Composer in the Broadway production of Moulin Rouge! at the Al Hirschfeld Theatre; previews began on June 28, 2019, and the production had its opening night on July 25. Tveit has been universally praised for his portrayal; New York Times theater critic Ben Brantley said that Christian was "a role [Tveit] was born to play" during the Boston run of the show and later said that his 'passionate and uncompromising' performance was his "best Broadway work to date". The production was put on hold, beginning on March 12, 2020, due to the COVID-19 pandemic, and on March 23, Tveit became the first Broadway star to announce a positive COVID-19 test result. He was one of at least four cast members who contracted the virus. In October 2020, he was nominated for the Tony Award for Best Performance by a Leading Actor in a Musical, one of the musical's fourteen nominations. Although not the only eligible actor in the category, he made history as the sole nominee for his category. He won the award, having received an affirmative vote by 60% or more of Tony voters. Tveit resumed his role as Christian when Moulin Rouge! reopened on September 24, 2021. With other original cast members, he departed the production on May 8, 2022.

During Broadway's closure in 2020, Tveit filmed the movie One Royal Holiday, part of Hallmark Channel's Countdown to Christmas movie slate. Tveit starred opposite theater actresses Laura Osnes and Krystal Joy Brown. Released in April 2021, Tveit was a cast member of Hit Job, a scripted comedy podcast produced by Lorne Michaels' Broadway Video for Audible. That year he also appeared in two episodes of the horror anthology series American Horror Stories. In 2021, he played Danny Bailey in the Apple TV+ musical comedy parody series Schmigadoon!; the show's second season was announced and began production in June 2022 and airs in spring 2023. Tveit returned to Moulin Rouge! as Christian for 12 weeks beginning on January 17, 2023.

Personal life 
Tveit moved to Manhattan in 2006 where he first lived in the Hell's Kitchen neighborhood. From 2007 to 2020, he lived in Astoria, Queens.

Acting credits

Film

Television

Theatre

Podcasts and audio books

Discography

Solo albums 
 The Radio In My Head: Live at 54 Below (Broadway Records, 2013)

Cast recordings 
 Next to Normal (Original Broadway Cast Recording) (Ghostlight Records, 2009);12 tracks
 Catch Me If You Can (Original Broadway Cast Recording) (Sh-K-Boom Records, 2011); 10 tracks
 Les Misérables: Highlights from the Motion Picture Soundtrack (Universal Republic, 2012); 4 tracks
 Les Misérables: The Motion Picture Soundtrack (Deluxe Edition) (Polydor Records, 2013); 9 tracks
 Grease Live! (Music From the Television Event) (Paramount Pictures, 2016); 6 tracks
An American Victory (Studio Cast Recording) (Broadway Records, 2016); "Sons of Adventure"
 Moulin Rouge! The Musical (Original Broadway Cast Recording) (RCA, 2019); 13 tracks
 Hallmark Channel's Christmas Album, Vol. II (Crown Media/Warner Music Nashville, 2020); "Winter Wonderland" from One Royal Holiday
 Schmigadoon! (Apple TV+ Original Series Soundtrack) EPs (Milan Records, 2021)
 Album (Ghostlight Records, 2022); "The Answer"

Accolades

Film and television

Theatre

References

External links 
 
 
 
 
 Aaron Tveit at Castalbums.org

1983 births
Living people
21st-century American male actors
American male film actors
American male musical theatre actors
American male television actors
American people of Norwegian descent
Clarence Derwent Award winners
Ithaca College alumni
Male actors from New York (state)
People from Middletown, Orange County, New York
Singers from New York (state)
Tony Award winners